Cephalastor is a small neotropical genus of potter wasps (Hymenoptera: Vespidae: Eumeninae) currently containing  14 species.

The known species are:

Cephalastor sinusiticus Garcete-Barrett, 2002 (Mexico)
Cephalastor lambayeque Garcete-Barrett, 2002 (Coastal Peru)
Cephalastor bossanova Garcete-Barrett, 2002 (Southern Brazil)
Cephalastor estela Garcete-Barrett, 2002 (Paraguay and Brazil)
Cephalastor humeralis Garcete-Barrett & Hermes, 2009 (Brazil)
Cephalastor mariachi Garcete-Barrett, 2001 (Mexico)
Cephalastor minarum Garcete-Barrett & Hermes, 2009 (Brazil)
Cephalastor abraham Garcete-Barrett, 2001 (Ecuador)
Cephalastor tupasy Garcete-Barrett, 2001 (Peruvian Amazon)
Cephalastor relativus (Fox, 1902) (Suriname, Eastern Colombia, Ecuador, Bolivia and Central Brazil)
Cephalastor rufosuffusus (Fox, 1902) (Guyana, Central Brazil and Paraguay)
Cephalastor paezi Garcete-Barrett, 2001 (Colombian Llanos)
Cephalastor rominae Garcete-Barrett, 2001 (Paraguayan Chaco)
Cephalastor chasqui Garcete-Barrett, 2001 (Eastern Bolivia and Andean Peru)

References

Potter wasps